Mimoides is a genus of butterflies in the family Papilionidae. The species native to the Americas were formerly in genus Eurytides.

Species
 Mimoides ariarathes (Esper, 1788)
 Mimoides euryleon (Hewitson, [1856]) – false cattleheart swallowtail
 Mimoides ilus (Fabricius, 1793) – Ilus swallowtail or dual-spotted swallowtail
 Mimoides lysithous (Hübner, [1821])
 Mimoides microdamas (Burnmeister, 1878)
 Mimoides pausanias (Hewitson, 1852) – bluish mimic-swallowtail or Pausanias swallowtail
 Mimoides phaon (Boisduval, 1836) – variable swallowtail or red-sided swallowtail
 Mimoides protodamas (Godart, 1819)
 Mimoides thymbraeus (Boisduval, 1836) – white-crescent swallowtail
 Mimoides xeniades (Hewitson, 1867)
 Mimoides xynias (Hewitson, 1875)

References

External links

 
 

 
Papilionidae
Papilionidae of South America
Butterfly genera